Chaetodemoticus is a genus of bristle flies in the family Tachinidae.

Species
Chaetodemoticus chilensis (Schiner, 1868)

Distribution
Chile.

References

Diptera of South America
Dexiinae
Tachinidae genera
Monotypic Brachycera genera
Taxa named by Friedrich Moritz Brauer
Taxa named by Julius von Bergenstamm